Brighton Science Festival is a yearly science festival held in Brighton, on the UK's South Coast since at least 2007. The festival is the brainchild of organiser Richard Robinson.

Traditionally the festival has been held in February, but since 2017 the festival has been split across the year, with one set of events held in February and another set in September.

External links
 Brighton Science Festival, homepage
 The Argus, 2017: Explore everyday wonders at Brighton Science Festival
 The Argus, 2017: Different format for Brighton Science Festival’s February return
 Culture 24: Science That Makes Your Eyes Pop! Brighton Science Festival 2007
 The Guardian: If festivals are supposed to educate the general public about science, they aren't succeeding, says Tim Radford
 Brighton Science Festival at Lighthouse (2013)

Science festivals
Science events in the United Kingdom